William Arthur McKenzie (25 December 1879 – 18 July 1916) was an Australian rules footballer who played for the Geelong Football Club in the Victorian Football League. He later moved to South Africa, and was killed during World War I.

Family
The  son of William Kenneth McKenzie (1850–1920), and Elizabeth Ann McKenzie (1854–1929), née Stoker, William Arthur McKenzie was born at Sandhurst, Victoria (known as Bendigo since 1891) on 25 December 1879.

Education
He attended Geelong Grammar School in 1898. Not only a fine schoolboy cricketer and footballer, he was an outstanding athlete.

At the 16 November 1898 Geelong Grammar School sports carnival he was the school's champion athlete, and was awarded the school's Championship Cup for his performance. He won the long jump by 14 inches (approx. 37cm), jumping 18ft. 11in. (approx. 5.78m), the 100 yards ("McKenzie … won easily"), the quarter mile ("McLaurin [who finished second] led till 50 yards from home, when McKenzie bolted to the front, winning by several yards"), the mile ("Belcher [who finished second] was leading until about 40 yards from the tap, but McKenzie then spurted to the front, and won by two or three yards"), and came third in the pole vault.

Football
He played for Geelong in the VFL in the last four games of the 1898 football season.

Military service

Boer War
He served overseas in the 2nd Victorian Mounted Rifles in the Second Boer War (1899–1902).

World War I
Permanently residing in South Africa, he enlisted in the South African Military Forces, and served overseas in the 1st Regiment South African Infantry.

Death
He was killed in action at Delville Wood, in France, on 18 July 1916. He has no known grave, and is commemorated at the Thiepval Memorial to the Missing of the Somme near Thiepval, in northern France.

See also
 List of Victorian Football League players who died in active service

Footnotes

References
 Holmesby, Russell & Main, Jim (2007). The Encyclopedia of AFL Footballers. 7th ed. Melbourne: Bas Publishing.
 Main, J. & Allen, D., "McKenzie, W. Arthur", pp.129–131 in Main, J. & Allen, D., Fallen – The Ultimate Heroes: Footballers Who Never Returned From War, Crown Content, (Melbourne), 2002. 
 Commemorative Roll: Private William Arthur McKenzie (4493), Australian War Memorial.

External links
 
 
 Private William Arthur McKenzie (4993), Commonwealth War Graves Commission.
 Cats Media, "Remembering those who made the ultimate sacrifice", geelongcats.com, 25 April 2020.

1879 births
1916 deaths
People educated at Geelong Grammar School
Australian rules footballers from Victoria (Australia)
Geelong Football Club players
Australian military personnel of the Second Boer War
South African military personnel of World War I
South African military personnel killed in World War I